The WZB Berlin Social Science Center (WZB), also known by its German initials WZB, is an internationally renowned research institute for the social sciences, the largest such institution in Europe not affiliated with a university.

It was founded in 1969 through an all-party initiative of the German Bundestag. Around 140 German and foreign sociologists, political scientists, economists, historians, statisticians, computer scientists and legal scholars work in the WZB conducting basic research on selected social and political issues, concentrating on the industrialized societies of Japan and the West, as well as the transformations of Central and Eastern Europe and China. The question of globalization is of particular importance.

Research areas 
The WZB is organized into seven research areas:

 Dynamics of Social Inequalities
 Markets and Choice
 Digitalization and Societal Transformation
 International Politics and Law
 Dynamics of Political Systems
 Migration and Diversity
 Political Economy of Development

Constituted as a non-profit limited liability company (GmbH), ownership is shared between the federal government (75 percent) and the city-state of Berlin (25 percent). WZB is a member of the Gottfried Wilhelm Leibniz Scientific Community.

Although not a university body, it collaborates with Free University of Berlin, Hertie School of Governance, Humboldt University, Technical University of Berlin, Berlin University of the Arts, as well as with research institutions in Berlin and abroad. Many WZB scientists are also university professors or hold teaching assignments.

Recent presidents of the WZB have included Meinolf Dierkes (1980–1987), Wolfgang Zapf (1987–1994), Friedhelm Neidhardt (1994–2000), and historian Jürgen Kocka (2001–2007). The current president is sociologist Jutta Allmendinger.

WZB is said to be the largest such research institution for the social sciences in Europe. Around 140 social scientists are conducting research on the developmental trends, problems of adaptation, and possibilities for innovation in modern societies.

The Federal Republic of Germany and the federal state of Berlin have been shareholders and main funders since 1976.

WZB headquarters on Landwehrkanal in Berlin-Tiergarten was designed 1979–1988 by the British architects James Stirling and Michael Wilford integrating the 1894 building of Reichsversicherungsamt.

A.SK Social Science Award and Fellowships 
Since 2007 the WZB grants the A.SK Award and Fellowships biannually: “The 100,000 Euro A.SK Social Science Award is one of the best-endowed awards in the social sciences. The endowment capital has been donated by the Chinese entrepreneurs Angela and Shu Kai Chan. The award recognizes outstanding contributions to social and political reform.” In German media award and fellowships were compared with internationally recognized prizes, such as the Johan Skytte Prize and the Balzan Prize. In 2007 all laureates for the Award and Award Fellowships were nominated and chosen by a selection committee consisting of: Prof. Jutta Allmendinger, Prof. Werner Abelshauser, Prof. Stefano Bartolini, Prof. Lord Dahrendorf Prof. Peter Katzenstein and Prof. Kai A. Konrad. Since 2009 the WZB also publishes Calls for Nominations for the A.SK Fellowship. In 2015 the selection committee includes: Prof. Jutta Allmendinger, Prof. Werner Abelshauser, Prof. Kurt Biedenkopf, Prof. Dorothea Kübler, Prof. Orlando Patterson and Prof. Shalini Randeria. The A.SK Award and Fellowships are handed over in a public ceremony, honoring the laureates and including leading politicians or scholars as speakers, in Berlin. In 2009 the ceremony was part of the celebration of the 40th anniversary of the WZB with the German president Horst Köhler as one of the speakers.

Recipients of the A.SK Social Science Award and A.SK Social Science Award Fellowships 
2019

Raj Chetty

2017

John Ruggie (Award)

Philipp Hacker

Alexander Horn

2015

Esther Duflo (Award)

Robert Lepenies

Juliana Silva Goncalves

Mahnaz Zahirinejad Varnosfaderani

2013

Paul Collier (Award)

Daniel Tischer

Rami Zeedan

Olga Ulybina

Josef Hien

Theresa Reinold

2011:

Transparency International (Award)

Yaman Kouli

Thamy Pogrebinschi

Martin Schröder

2009

Martha C. Nussbaum (Award)

Arolda Elbasani

Alexander Petring

Juan Fernandez

2007

Sir Anthony Atkinson (Award)

Andreas Leutzsch

Felix Kolb

Janine Leschke

People affiliated with WZB 
Ralf Dahrendorf
Jürgen Kocka
William H. Starbuck

See also
 Berlin Graduate School for Transnational Studies
 List of universities, colleges, and research institutions in Berlin
 Hertie School of Governance

Notes

External links 
WZB website 
 WZB website 
 "Think Tank Directory" Profile of the WZB 

Research institutes in Germany
Social science institutes
Buildings and structures in Berlin
Organisations based in Berlin
Education in Berlin
Leibniz Association
Organizations established in 1969